John Sherwood de Lancie Jr. (born March 20, 1948) is an American actor, director, producer, writer, and comedian, best known for his role as Q in various Star Trek series (1987–present); beginning with Star Trek: The Next Generation and leading right up to the second season of Star Trek: Picard in 2022.

His other television series roles include Eugene Bradford in Days of Our Lives (1982–1986; 1989–1990), Frank Simmons in Stargate SG-1 (2001–2002), Donald Margolis in Breaking Bad (2009–2010), Agent Allen Shapiro in Torchwood (2011), as well as the voice of Discord in My Little Pony: Friendship Is Magic (2011–2019).

De Lancie has become an outspoken secular activist and was a featured speaker at the 2016 Reason Rally and at CSICon 2019.

Early life and education
De Lancie was born John Sherwood de Lancie Jr. in Philadelphia, Pennsylvania on March 20, 1948, one of two children born to John de Lancie Sr. (1921–2002), principal oboist of the Philadelphia Orchestra from 1954 to 1977, and Andrea de Lancie. He has a sister named Christina.

He was diagnosed with dyslexia as a child and, as such, struggled with reading difficulties throughout his school years. He did not learn to read until he was 12. One of his teachers recommended that his parents encourage him to consider a career as an actor. He began to act around the age of 14, performing in a high school production of William Shakespeare's Henry V. De Lancie went on to study acting at Kent State University (he was in attendance during the Kent State shootings on May 4, 1970) and won a scholarship at Juilliard. He performed in numerous stage productions, participating at such engagements as the American Shakespeare Festival and the Mark Taper Forum, as well as establishing a successful career in film and television.

Acting career

Film and TV career (1987–present)

Star Trek

De Lancie portrayed Q in Star Trek: The Next Generation (1987–1994), and in episodes of several subsequent series taking place during that era. He is notable for his chaotic, mischievous personality. He is one of the few characters appearing in multiple series of the franchise: Eight episodes of Star Trek: The Next Generation ("Encounter at Farpoint", "Hide and Q", "Q Who", "Deja Q", "Qpid", "True Q", "Tapestry", "All Good Things..."), one episode of Star Trek: Deep Space Nine ("Q-Less"), three episodes of Star Trek: Voyager ("Death Wish," "The Q and the Grey," "Q2"), and one episode of Star Trek: Lower Decks ("Veritas"). De Lancie's son Keegan de Lancie appeared with his father as Q Junior in one episode of Star Trek: Voyager ("Q2").

Initially, de Lancie was too busy to audition for the part of Q, but Gene Roddenberry (whom he did not know) arranged a second opportunity. De Lancie recognized that even though Star Trek was only a small part of his career, it opened doors for him. In a 2012 interview, de Lancie stated that he recalled his original audition for Q, after which Roddenberry approached him, touched him on the shoulder, and said, "You make my writing sound better than it is."

In April 2021, it was announced that de Lancie would reprise his role of Q in the second season of Star Trek: Picard.

Other film and television
In addition to his role in Star Trek, de Lancie appeared in many other television series. In 1982, he started his career as a popular actor on Days of Our Lives as Eugene Bradford.
He also co-starred in Michael Piller's creation Legend and had recurring roles in Stargate SG-1 as an NID agent. He guest-starred in multiple television series, including Breaking Bad as Donald Margolis, The West Wing, Charmed, Andromeda, The Unit, MacGyver, Law & Order: LA, Torchwood: Miracle Day, Touched by an Angel, Time Trax, the 1980s revival of Mission: Impossible, and Special Unit 2.

His film credits include The Hand that Rocks the Cradle, Get Smart, Again!, The Fisher King, Bad Influence, The Onion Field, Taking Care of Business, Fearless, Arcade, Multiplicity, Woman on Top, Good Advice, Pathology, Evolver, Reign Over Me, My Apocalypse, Crank: High Voltage, and You Lucky Dog.

De Lancie was a celebrity spokesman for Compaq computers. His son Keegan also appeared in commercials for Dell computers.

Video games
De Lancie voiced Antonio Malochio in Interstate '76, Trias in Planescape: Torment, Dr. Death in Outlaws, William Miles in Assassin's Creed: Revelations and Assassin's Creed III, Fitz Quadwrangle in Quantum Conundrum, and Q in both the Star Trek: The Next Generation pinball game and the mobile game Star Trek Timelines, and portrayed Q in Star Trek: Borg. He further voiced the human emperor in Master of Orion: Conquer the Stars. He also voiced Alarak in StarCraft 2: Legacy of the Void and reprised the role for Heroes of the Storm. More recently, he voiced Geist, the leader of the Templars in the XCOM 2 expansion War of the Chosen. He voiced the narrator wizard of Popup Dungeon.

Stage

De Lancie is a former member of the American Shakespeare Festival, the Seattle Repertory Company, South Coast Repertory, the Mark Taper Forum, and the Old Globe (where he performed Arthur Miller's Resurrection Blues). He performed and directed for Los Angeles Theater Works, the producing arm of KCRW-FM and National Public Radio, where the series The Play's the Thing originated.

De Lancie co-hosted and appeared in Star Trek: The Music, a touring company, with fellow actor Robert Picardo, who portrayed the Doctor in Star Trek: Voyager. De Lancie and Picardo narrate around the orchestral performance, explaining the history of the music in Star Trek. He performed Pierre Curie in Alan Alda's play Radiance: The Passion of Marie Curie in 2001 at the Geffen Theater in Los Angeles. De Lancie hosted the children's concerts at Walt Disney Concert Hall during the 2003–04 season; in 2005, he hosted the children's series of the Los Angeles Philharmonic.

Voice acting
Known for his distinctive speaking style, de Lancie lent his voice to a number of projects. In My Little Pony: Friendship Is Magic, he voiced Discord, a recurring character. Discord was inspired by Q as an omnipotent being who embodies mischief and chaos, but is genuinely good-hearted and is occasionally helpful to the heroes of the show; another connection to Q is that Discord often uses fewer contractions in his vocabulary. Discord is best described as an anti-hero, also similar to Q. Initially, Lauren Faust wanted to cast someone who could impersonate de Lancie, but Hasbro suggested casting de Lancie himself. Ironically, de Lancie has stated in an interview that, in preparation for his role as Discord, he did not draw from his past experience as Q. De Lancie mentioned during a 2013 convention panel that his voice recordings of Discord are slightly sped up and lose their deep bass sound. Nevertheless, fans still praised de Lancie for his performance. According to Jim Miller in The Art of Equestria, de Lancie's sessions are always done by phone, but his first session as Discord was videotaped.

His other animated television roles included The Angry Beavers, Extreme Ghostbusters, Invader Zim, Duck Dodgers, Max Steel, Duckman, Young Justice, and DC Super Hero Girls as Mr. Freeze.

Writing
De Lancie co-wrote the Star Trek novel I, Q with Peter David, as well as co-writing the novel Soldier of Light (with Tom Cool). He wrote the DC comic book story The Gift. In 1996, along with Leonard Nimoy and writer-producer Nat Segaloff, de Lancie formed and recorded Alien Voices, a collection of audio dramas based on classic science fiction and fantasy stories, such as The Time Machine and The Lost World.

Music
De Lancie has performed as narrator with a number of major orchestras including the New York Philharmonic, the Los Angeles Philharmonic, the Philadelphia Orchestra, the Sydney Symphony Orchestra, the National Symphony Orchestra, the Montreal Symphony Orchestra and Symphony Nova Scotia. He provided the narration for the world premiere of Lorenzo Palomo's The Sneetches and Other Stories (based on the book by Dr. Seuss) with the Oberlin Conservatory Orchestra. He wrote and directed ten symphonic plays, which were produced with the Milwaukee, St. Paul Chamber, Ravinia, Los Angeles, and Pasadena Orchestras.

De Lancie was the writer, director and host of First Nights, an adult concert series at the Walt Disney Concert Hall with the Los Angeles Philharmonic, based loosely on the book of the same name by Thomas Forrest Kelly, which explored the life and music of Stravinsky, Beethoven, Mahler, Schumann, and Prokofiev. In 2006, de Lancie made his opera directorial debut with the Atlanta Opera performing Puccini's "Tosca" from May 18–21.

In September 2019, de Lancie narrated as "Forever of the Stars" in the first ever live performances of Ayreon's Sci-Fi concept album Into the Electric Castle.

Documentary
While on stage at the 2012 Ottawa ComicCon, de Lancie announced that he had made plans to co-produce a documentary about "bronies" (older, usually male teenage and adult fans of My Little Pony: Friendship Is Magic). De Lancie stated he was taken aback by how disrespectfully national news media portrayed the brony fandom. He started a Kickstarter campaign to help fund the documentary, since titled Bronies: The Extremely Unexpected Adult Fans of My Little Pony. The Kickstarter campaign began on May 13, 2012, and by June 10, had reached a total of $322,022, becoming Kickstarter's second-highest funded film project of all time.

Personal life
De Lancie is married to Marnie Mosiman and the couple have two sons Keegan (born 1984) and Owen (born 1987).

De Lancie is an experienced sailor, spending time on the Pacific Ocean, which he had stated "sometimes involves very terrifying experiences."

He is long-time friends with fellow Star Trek alum Kate Mulgrew. He is also good friends with MacGyver and Stargate SG-1 star Richard Dean Anderson. They have both appeared together in episodes of both series, as well as in the 1995 television series Legend.

Secular activism
Raised by secular parents, de Lancie is an advocate for atheism and humanism. Of his education in a religious school in Philadelphia, he remembers associating religion with manipulation. Rather than developing a religious outlook, he became fascinated by an ever-changing world: "I'm wondering if one of the things at the core of believing in God, or not, has to do with change. I have grown to embrace change. Personally, I love reading the science section in the paper every morning. I'm in awe of humankind's boundless curiosity."

On June 4, 2016, he addressed the participants at the Reason Rally in Washington, D.C. Speaking in reference to his Star Trek character Q, he said:

On July 14, 2017, de Lancie attended the unveiling of a statue of Clarence Darrow at the Rhea County Courthouse, Dayton, Tennessee, the site of the Scopes Trial in 1925, where Darrow had argued in favor of the teaching of evolution and secular education.

In October 2019, de Lancie was a featured speaker at the annual conference of the Center for Inquiry, CSICon. At the conference he announced two new projects. The first, an animated series, titled God's Goofs, is meant to point out that intelligent design is absurd. The second project is a play based on the historic 2005 intelligent design trial in Dover, Pennsylvania, the first direct challenge brought in the United States federal courts testing a public school district policy that required the teaching of intelligent design.

Filmography

Film

Television

Video games

References

External links

 
 
 
 StarTrek.com biography 
 John de Lancie Interview at AMCtv.com (archive)

1948 births
20th-century American comedians
20th-century American composers
20th-century American male actors
20th-century American novelists
20th-century atheists
20th-century educators
20th-century sailors
21st-century American comedians
21st-century American composers
21st-century American male actors
21st-century American novelists
21st-century atheists
21st-century educators
Activists from Pennsylvania
Activists from Philadelphia
American activists 
American atheism activists
American atheists
American directors
American documentary filmmakers
American educators
American humanists
American male comedians
American male composers
American male film actors
American male novelists
American male sailors (sport)
American male singers
American male soap opera actors
American male stage actors
American male television actors
American male video game actors
American male voice actors
American male writers
American people of French descent
American producers
American sailors
American science fiction writers
American secularists
American social commentators
Audiobook narrators
Comedians from Pennsylvania
Critics of creationism
Critics of religions
Educators from Pennsylvania
Educators from Philadelphia
Filmmakers from Pennsylvania
Juilliard School alumni
Kent State University alumni
Living people
Male actors from Pennsylvania
Male actors from Philadelphia
Political activists from Pennsylvania
Secular humanists
Spokespersons
Television producers from Pennsylvania
Writers about religion and science
Writers from Pennsylvania
Writers from Philadelphia
Actors with dyslexia
Writers with dyslexia